Shukavka is a rural locality (a selo) in Morozovskoye Rural Settlement, Ertilsky District, Voronezh Oblast, Russia. The population was 52 as of 2010. There are 3 streets.

Geography 
Shukavka is located 18 km northwest of Ertil (the district's administrative centre) by road. Yacheyka is the nearest rural locality.

References 

Rural localities in Ertilsky District